The 1994 Tippeligaen was the 50th completed season of top division football in Norway. Each team played 22 games with 3 points given for wins and 1 for draws. This year was the last consisting of 12 teams. The format was expanded to 14 teams the following year. Because of this, number eleven and twelve were relegated, while the winners and runners-up of the two groups of the first division were promoted.

Teams and locations
''Note: Table lists in alphabetical order.

League table
Molde FK qualified for the UEFA Cup Winners' Cup as a team from lower division.

Promotion and relegation
Strindheim, Hødd, Molde and Stabæk were promoted.
Sogndal and Strømsgodset were relegated.
Because of the format-expansion, no play-offs were played this year.

Results

Season statistics

Top scorers

Attendances

References 

Eliteserien seasons
Norway
Norway
1